David William Edmunds (born 15 April 1944) is a Welsh singer-songwriter, guitarist and record producer. Although he is mainly associated with pub rock and new wave, having many hits in the 1970s and early 1980s, his natural leaning has always been towards 1950s-style rock and roll and rockabilly.

Career

Early bands
Edmunds was born in Cardiff, Wales. As a ten-year-old, he first played in 1954 with a band called the Edmunds Bros Duo with his older brother Geoff (born 5 December 1939, Cardiff); this was a piano duo. Then the brothers were in the Stompers, later called the Heartbeats, formed around 1957 with Geoff on rhythm guitar, Dave on lead guitar, Denny Driscoll on lead vocals, Johnny Stark on drums, Ton Edwards on bass and Allan Galsworthy on rhythm. Then Dave and Geoff were in The 99ers along with scientist and writer Brian J. Ford. After that Dave Edmunds was in Crick Feather's Hill-Bill's formed in c 1960, with Feathers (Edmunds) on lead guitar; Zee Dolan on bass; Tennessee Tony on lead vocals; Tony Kees on piano and Hank Two Sticks on drums. The first group that Edmunds fronted was the Cardiff-based 1950s style rockabilly trio The Raiders formed in 1961, along with Brian 'Rockhouse' Davies on bass (born 15 January 1943, Cardiff) and Ken Collier on drums. Edmunds was the only constant member of the group, which later included bassist Mick Still, Bob 'Congo' Jones on drums (b. 13 August 1946, Barry, South Wales) and John Williams (stage name John David) on bass. The Raiders worked almost exclusively in the South Wales area.

In 1966, after a short spell in a Parlophone recording band, the Image (1965–1966), with local drummer Tommy Riley, Edmunds shifted to a more blues-rock sound, reuniting with Congo Jones and bassist John Williams and adding second guitarist Mickey Gee to form the short-lived Human Beans, a band that played mostly in London and on the UK university circuit.  In 1967, the band recorded a cover of "Morning Dew" on the British Columbia label, that failed to have any chart impact. After just eighteen months, the core of Human Beans formed a new band called Love Sculpture that again reinstated Edmunds, Jones and Williams as a trio. Love Sculpture released their debut single "River to Another Day" in 1968. Their second single was a quasi-novelty Top 5, a reworking Khachaturian's classical piece "Sabre Dance" as a speed-crazed rock number, inspired by Keith Emerson's classical rearrangements. "Sabre Dance" became a hit after garnering the enthusiastic attention of British DJ John Peel, who was so impressed he played it twice in one programme on "Top Gear". The band issued two albums.

Solo career 
After Love Sculpture split, Edmunds had a UK Christmas Number 1 single in 1970 with "I Hear You Knocking", a Smiley Lewis cover, which he came across while producing Shakin' Stevens and the Sunsets' first album entitled A Legend. The recording was the first release on Edmunds' manager's MAM Records label. This single also reached No. 4 in the US, making it Edmunds' biggest hit by far on either side of Atlantic Ocean. It sold over three million copies, and was awarded a gold disc. Edmunds had intended to record Wilbert Harrison's "Let's Work Together", but when he was beaten to that song by Canned Heat, he adapted the arrangement he intended to use for it to "I Hear You Knocking". The success of the single caused EMI's Regal Zonophone Records to use an option that it had to claim Edmunds' album, 1972's Rockpile, and the momentum from the single's success on a different label went away.

Edmunds' only acting role followed, as a band member in the David Essex movie Stardust. After learning the trade of producer, culminating in a couple of singles in the style of Phil Spector, "Baby I Love You" and "Born to Be with You", he became linked with the pub rock movement of the early 1970s, producing (among others) Brinsley Schwarz, Ducks Deluxe, Flamin' Groovies, and blues rock band Foghat, using a stripped down, grittier sound.

Edmunds had bought a house in Rockfield, Monmouth, a few miles away from Charles and Kingsley Ward's Rockfield Studios where he became an almost permanent fixture for the next twenty years. His working regime involved arriving at the studio in the early evening and working through till well after dawn, usually locked in the building alone. Applying the layered Spector sound to his own productions it was not unusual for Edmunds to multilayer up to forty separately recorded guitar tracks into the mix.

Rockpile and other collaborations

His own solo LP from 1975, Subtle as a Flying Mallet, was similar in style. The Brinsley Schwarz connection brought about a collaboration with Nick Lowe starting with this album, and in 1976 they formed the group Rockpile, with Billy Bremner and Terry Williams. Because Edmunds and Lowe signed to different record labels that year, they could not record as Rockpile until 1980, but many of their solo LPs (such as Lowe's Labour of Lust and Edmunds' own Repeat When Necessary) were group recordings. Edmunds had more UK hits during this time, including Elvis Costello's "Girls Talk", Nick Lowe's "I Knew the Bride", Hank DeVito's "Queen of Hearts" (later a larger, international hit for American country-rock singer Juice Newton), Graham Parker's "Crawling from the Wreckage", and Melvin Endsley's "Singing the Blues" (originally a 1956 US Country No. 1 hit for Marty Robbins, then a US pop No. 1 cover for Guy Mitchell, and a UK No. 1 for both Mitchell and Tommy Steele). The album Repeat When Necessary received a Silver Certification from the British Phonographic Industry on 20 March 1980 (for over 60,000 copies sold in the UK). The single "Girls Talk" also received a Silver Certificate from the BPI.

Unexpectedly, after Rockpile released their first LP under their own name, Seconds of Pleasure (1980), the band split. Edmunds and the band, including Lowe, performed in a music video for the track "Girls Talk", directed by Martin Pitts and produced by Derek Burbidge and Helen Pollack. For the video the band set up on the roof of the Warner Brothers Records building in Midtown Manhattan in the early afternoon. Edmunds spent the 1980s collaborating with and producing an assortment of artists, including Paul McCartney, King Kurt, Stray Cats, Fabulous Thunderbirds, and Status Quo. He recorded the soundtrack for the movie Porky's Revenge!, supplying the main theme, "High School Nights," and was the musical director for a television special starring Carl Perkins, with assorted guests including George Harrison, Ringo Starr, and Rosanne Cash. In 1989, Edmunds produced the album Yo Frankie for Dion.

On his 1983 release, Information, Edmunds collaborated on two songs with Jeff Lynne, the leader of Electric Light Orchestra. One of these songs, a Lynne composition, "Slipping Away", became Edmunds' only other US Top 40 hit, spending a single week at No. 39 while having a video clip in heavy rotation on MTV. It was not a hit in the UK. In 1984, Lynne produced six tracks on Edmunds' following album, Riff Raff.

In late 1985, Dave Edmunds was the musical director and a participating band member of Carl Perkins's Rockabilly Session television special. Other musicians involved in the project included George Harrison, Ringo Starr, and Eric Clapton.

1990 onwards

Edmunds recorded less frequently after the mid-1980s, living in Wales in semi-retirement, but occasionally touring. He joined up with Ringo Starr & His All-Starr Band for tours in 1992 and 2000. However, 2007 marked a return to touring for Edmunds, alongside Joe Brown, on a lengthy tour around the UK. He made an appearance on stage alongside Stray Cats, at the Brixton Academy in London, on 10 September 2008, playing "The Race Is On" and "Tear It Up" with the band.

In 1993 Edmunds was in Cardiff Crown Court as a co-defendant along with Shakin' Stevens facing charges of non-payment of playing royalties from former Sunsets' band members Robert Llewellyn, Carl Petersen, Steve Percy and Paul Dolan.  The prosecution asserted that the former band members were due a share of those additional royalties that Stevens and Edmunds had received from the successful reissue of the album A Legend during the early eighties.  The judge agreed and, while the unpaid royalties only amounted to around £70,000 to be divided between the four musicians, the associated court costs to be paid by Stevens and Edmunds amounted to £500,000.

On New Year's Eve 2008, he appeared on Jools' Annual Hootenanny, performing "Girls Talk" and "I Hear You Knocking".  He was Holland's guest again at Borde Hill Garden on 20 June 2009, on 28 August at open-air concert at Carrickfergus Castle., 31 October at Ipswich Regent, 7 November at Stoke Victoria Hall and 14 November at Nottingham Concert Hall.  Edmunds also played a five-song set, including "I Hear You Knocking," "I Knew the Bride" and "Sabre Dance" with the Holland Big Band at the Royal Albert Hall on 27 November 2009.

He returned and performed "Sabre Dance" on Jools' Annual Hootenanny on the 2009/10 edition. An album release on 19 November 2013 called ...Again, featured recordings from the 1990s, plus four new tracks, Edmunds' first for almost 20 years, with the title track released as a digital download single. In 2015, Edmunds released his first instrumental album On Guitar... Dave Edmunds: Rags & Classics, which featured instrumental covers of classic songs such as The Beach Boys' "God Only Knows" and Elton John's "Your Song". The album was Edmunds' final album and after playing a final show in July 2017, he was reported to have retired from the music business.

Selected discography

Studio albums
with Love Sculpture:
Blues Helping (December 1968)
Forms and Feelings (January 1970)

with Rockpile:
Seconds of Pleasure (October 1980)

as Dave Edmunds:

Live albums
I Hear You Rockin' (June 1987) (US #106)
Live on the King Biscuit Flower Hour (May 1999)
A Pile of Rock: Live Featuring Billy Bremner, Geraint Watkins & the Refreshments (Sweden, 1999) (Pool CD018)
C'Mon Everybody Live (Same source as King Biscuit Flower Hour – May 1999, but different tracks) (January 2004)
Alive & Pickin (Canadian mail order only) (February 2005)

Compilations
with Love Sculpture:
The Classic Tracks 1968/1972 – EMI UK – 1974
The Dave Edmunds & Love Sculpture Singles A's & B's – Harvest Heritage – EMI UK – 1980

as Dave Edmunds':

Singles

Music videos

Notes

References

External links
Dave Edmunds biography from BBC Wales
Listen to Dave Edmunds Live at The Capitol Theatre on 6 June 1982
Listen to Dave Edmunds Live at Roseland Ballroom on 18 June 1983
Listen to Dave Edmunds Live at Roseland Ballroom on 19 June 1983

1944 births
Year of birth uncertain
Living people
Musicians from Cardiff
Welsh male singers
Welsh record producers
Rockpile members
Swan Song Records artists
Welsh new wave musicians
Atco Records artists
MAM Records artists
Welsh rock guitarists
Welsh songwriters
Lead guitarists
Slide guitarists
Welsh multi-instrumentalists
British rockabilly musicians
Rhythm guitarists
Power pop musicians
Welsh rock singers
Ringo Starr & His All-Starr Band members